Gordon Trueman Riviere Waller (4 June 1945 – 17 July 2009) was a Scottish guitarist, singer and songwriter, best known as Gordon of the 1960s pop music duo Peter and Gordon, whose biggest hit was the no. 1 million-selling single "A World Without Love".

Biography
Waller was born in Braemar, Aberdeenshire, Scotland, the son of a prominent surgeon. The family later moved to Middlesex, when Waller was a child, where Waller gained entrance to Westminster School. While attending Westminster School, he met fellow student Peter Asher, also the son of a doctor, and they began playing together as a duo – Peter and Gordon. Asher mentioned in a 2006 interview that "Our voices are quite different, Gordon's and mine, but we tried singing together experimentally and we found that we could achieve this very nice harmony."

Asher is the older brother of actress and businesswoman Jane Asher, who in the mid-1960s was girlfriend of the Beatles' Paul McCartney. Through this connection he and Waller were often given unrecorded Lennon–McCartney songs to perform, most notably their first and biggest hit, "A World Without Love" (1964).

Peter and Gordon disbanded in 1968. Afterward, Waller attempted a solo career with little success, releasing one record, ...and Gordon. On this album Waller used a New York-based group White Cloud, featuring Teddy Wender on keyboards. He also appeared in a production of Joseph and the Amazing Technicolor Dreamcoat as Pharaoh in 1971, a performance that he reprised on the LP. Waller first performed "Joseph" at the Edinburgh Festival, later reprising the role at the Albery Theatre in London's West End. In the mid-1970s Waller worked as a photocopier salesman with Rank Xerox in Leicester whilst living in Everdon, Northamptonshire.  In 1995, he moved to Los Angeles, California, and started a publishing company, Steel Wallet International. Ltd., with his longtime friend and girlfriend, Georgiana Steele. After his divorce from Gay Robbins was final, he and Georgiana married on 15 August 1998, although they divorced in 2007.

Waller returned to recording in 2002 as part of the He's a Rebel: The Gene Pitney Story Retold project produced by Gary Pig Gold. In 2007, Waller released a solo album Plays the Beatles, featuring a new recording of "Woman", which Paul McCartney wrote under the pseudonym of Bernard Webb, and which had been a Peter and Gordon hit in the mid-1960s. In 2008, he followed up with the release of Rebel Rider. On 19 July 2008, Peter and Gordon performed together at The Cannery Casino in Las Vegas, Nevada. Also on the bill that night were Chad & Jeremy. Both duos sang the final concert song ("Bye Bye Love") together for only the second time. On 21 August 2008, they performed a free concert on the pier in Santa Monica, California, briefly accompanied by Joan Baez. On 2 February 2009 Gordon performed with Asher at the Surf Ballroom as part of a tribute concert marking the 50th anniversary of "the Day the Music Died".

Waller married three times. The first two ended in divorce. His first wife was Gay Robbins; his second marriage was to Georgiana Steele. His third marriage, to Josenia (Jen) Couldrey, lasted from March 2008 until his death. He is survived by his two grown daughters, Phillippa and Natalie, both by first wife Gay, and a granddaughter, Tyla, as well as both his sisters, Diana and Annie.

Waller resided in the village of Fowey, in Cornwall, for eight years, when his daughters were young. At the time of his death, his first wife continued to reside in Fowey and his daughters remained associated with the village.  In later life, Waller lived in Ledyard, Connecticut. He went into cardiac arrest on the evening of 16 July 2009, and died aged 64 of a heart attack early in the morning of 17 July 2009 at Backus Hospital in Norwich, Connecticut.

On 29 May 2010 a sold-out tribute performance for Gordon Waller was held at the Cannery Casino and Hotel, which was Waller's favourite Las Vegas venue. Performers included Peter Asher, Chad and Jeremy, Denny Laine, Terry Sylvester of The Hollies, Ian Whitcomb, John Walker of the Walker Brothers and DJ Fontana, Elvis Presley's drummer.

Discography

With Peter and Gordon
 In Touch With... (1964)
 Peter and Gordon (1964)
 World Without Love (1964)
 Hurtin' 'n' Lovin''' (1965)
 I Don't Want to See You Again (1965)
 I Go to Pieces (1965)
 True Love Ways (1965)
 Best of Peter and Gordon (1966)
 Peter and Gordon	Sing & Play the Hits of Nashville (1966)
 Somewhere (1966)
 Woman (1966)
 In London for Tea (1967)
 Knight in Rusty Armour (1967)
 Lady Godiva (1967)
 Hot Cold & Custard (1968)
 Best of Peter and Gordon (1983)
 Hits of Peter and Gordon (1983)
 Best of Peter and Gordon (1991)
 Ultimate Peter and Gordon (2001)	 	 
 Definitive Collection: Knights in Rusty Armour (2003)

By himself
 ...and Gordon (1972)
 Joseph and the Amazing Technicolor Dreamcoat (Gordon Waller, as Pharaoh ) (1974)
Race with Destiny (1996) 
 Plays the Beatles (by Gordon Waller) (2007)
 Rebel Rider'' (by Gordon Waller) (2008)

References

External links
 A biography of Gordon

1945 births
2009 deaths
ABC Records artists
People educated at Westminster School, London
Scottish expatriates in the United States
Scottish male guitarists
Scottish singer-songwriters
20th-century Scottish male singers
20th-century British guitarists
People from Ledyard, Connecticut
People from Fowey
20th-century British male musicians
British male singer-songwriters